Neptunkryssare is a  sailboat class designed by Lage Eklund and built in about  copies.

History
The Neptunkryssare was designed in 1938 for artist Einar Palme and become popular in Swedish cities Gävle and Uppsala. In 1944 it gained Swedish Championship status.

References

External links

 Neptunkryssare Class Association

1930s sailboat type designs
Sailboat type designs by Swedish designers
Keelboats